The Republican Communist Network is a communist political organisation in Scotland. It was a founding member of the Scottish Socialist Party in 1998, though formally disaffiliated from the party in 2012. It is an active participant in the Radical Independence Campaign.

The party publishes a journal called Emancipation and Liberation.

References

External links
 Website of the Republican Communist Network

Communist parties in Scotland
Republican parties in the United Kingdom
Scottish republicanism
Political campaigns in the United Kingdom